Katia Beauchamp is an American entrepreneur, billionaire and co-founder of Birchbox.

Early life and education 
Katia Beauchamp, (née Ververis), was born in Austin, Texas but moved to El Paso when she was four years old. She was raised by her mother, who is of Mexican descent. Her father, who is Greek, lived in Germany. Beauchamp has a younger brother.

Beauchamp attended several elementary schools in El Paso including Dr. Green Elementary School in West El Paso. She graduated from Coronado High School and later attended Vassar College, graduating in 2005 with a double major in international studies and economics with a minor in Spanish.

Career 
After graduating from Vassar College, Beauchamp began her career in structured finance and then moved into commercial real estate. She founded Birchbox in 2010 while at Harvard Business School.

In 2016, Beauchamp received the Women’s Entrepreneurship Day Pioneer Award in recognition of her achievements in beauty. She is of Mexican-American ethniticy.

Beauchamp and her co-founder, Hayley Barna, were named to Inc. Magazine's "30 under 30" list in 2016. The two were also named to Advertising Age's "Women to Watch" in 2012. In 2013, Crain's New York Business included Beauchamp in their annual "30 Under 30" list.

In February 2020, Beauchamp announced that Birchbox would be laying off 25% of its global workforce including half of its New York City-based staff. This followed an earlier round of layoffs in 2016 when the company shed 12% of its worldwide headcount.

Personal life 
Beauchamp met her husband, Greg, when the two were 10 years old and attending Dr, Green Elementary School in El Paso. The couple were engaged on the playground where they first met. The couple has four children: a son, Niko, twin boys, Guy and Alec, and a daughter, West Winter.

In 2016, Beauchamp's net worth was estimated at US $1billion.

References 

Harvard Business School alumni
American women company founders
American company founders
Living people
Year of birth missing (living people)
21st-century American women
American people of Greek descent
American people of Mexican descent